Pigeon racing was contested at the 1900 Olympic Games in Paris. It is known that there were seven events on the 1900 Olympic Games schedule. These events have generally not been classified as official, although the IOC has never decided which events were "Olympic" and which were not.

References

External links
GB Athletics - Olympic Games Medallists - Other Sports - Demonstration & Unofficial Sports

Olympics
1900 Summer Olympics events
Discontinued sports at the Summer Olympics